Daniel Glancy (born 13 November 1988) is a former Irish professional tennis player. He was born and raised in County Mayo, Ireland.

Career
Glancy has spent most of his career on the Futures Circuit where he has won seven doubles titles. He made history in April 2013 when he became the first player from Connacht to represent the Irish Davis Cup team. He defeated Micke Kontinen of Finland in his debut Davis Cup match and holds a 1–3 record in the competition. He retired from professional tennis in 2016 because of his cronic hip injury.

Future and Challenger finals

Doubles 18 (7–11)

References

External links
 
 
 

1988 births
Living people
Irish male tennis players
People from Castlebar
Sportspeople from County Mayo